The Roman Catholic Diocese of Civita(-Tempio) was a Latin Catholic bishopric in the Gallura region of northern Sardinia (Tyrrhenian Sea, southwestern Italy).

It was heir to the ancient diocese of Pausania or Phausania (6th to 8th? century), restored in 1070 as the Diocese of Gallura, in 1113 renamed after its episcopal seat as the Diocese of Civita. In 1839 it was renamed as Diocese of Civita–Tempio, until its formal suppression in 1986, when it was merged into the Diocese of Tempio-Ampurias (effectively absorbing the Diocese of Ampurias, with which it had been held in personal union since 1506).

Ancient diocese of Fausania 
No later than the sixth century, a Roman bishopric was established at a place called Pausania or Phausania, which may be Olbia, Tempio Pausania or even Posada (50 km south of Olbia).

While local Saint Simplicius is traditionally revered as its 4th century founding first bishop, a historical thesis  holds it may have been (re?)founded by Catholic bishop(s) exiled by king Huneric of the Vandal Kingdom after his council of Carthage replaced them with Donatist heretic counterparts, only to be abandoned again due to the 552 invasion of the Ostrogoths under king Totila.

Its first historical mention is in 594, when Pope Gregory the Great invites its Metropolitan, the Archdiocese of Cagliari, to nominate a candidate for the vacant see. Its first documented incumbent, bishop Victor, was mentioned in a papal letter in 599, recalling his work to evangelize the pagan locals, and attended a synod in Rome in 600.

The see of Phausania is still listed in the Byzantine Notitia Episcopatuum  until circa 1000; but this may well have been a refusal to canonically acknowledge the diocese being effectively wiped much earlier, plausibly in the 8th century by Arab invaders.

Diocese of Civita(-Tempio) 

The bishopric was only restored probably in 1070, as Diocese of Gallura, named after the Giudicato of Gallura, one of the four autonomous temporal jurisdictions into which Pope Alexander II (1061-1073) divided the island, but is first recorded on a map dated 1095.

In the 11th century, the Basilica of San Simplicio was erected (in Olbia, then called Civita) as diocesan cathedral.

The see was exempt, i.e. directly dependent on the Holy See (not part of any ecclesiastical province, just as the region's second bishopric, the Diocese of Galtellì, which may have been founded as late as 1113, when the (remainder?) bishopric of Gallura was renamed after its see as Diocese of Civita. In 1138, the papal bulla Tunc apostolicae sedis, from Pope Innocent II, made both suffragan of the Metropolitan Archdiocese of Pisa on the Italian peninsula (and capital of the dogal state which colonized part of the island), but it seems both were rendered exempt again later in that century, unlike the other three giudicati, where Metropolitans of their own were established.

It has had some uncanonical incumbents, not obedient to the canonical Popes of Rome, two rather to the Antipopes in Avignon.

From 1506.06.05, the see was held in personal union ('United aeque principaliter ') with the neighboring Diocese of Ampurias until they were formally merged on 1986.09.30 and renamed as the present Roman Catholic Diocese of Tempio-Ampurias). Meanwhile, on 1839.08.26, the see of Civita had been renamed as Diocese of Civita–Tempio. After the merger, the former cathedral at Olbia (the former Civita) remained only a minor basilica, while the cathedral see is the Cattedrale di S. Pietro Apostolo, at Tempio-Pausania.

Episcopal Ordinaries 
(all Roman Rite)

Suffragan Bishops of Civita 
 first centuries unavailable
 Tommaso Sferrato, Friars Minor (O.F.M.) (1351 – 1353), later Bishop of Cagli (Italy) (1353 – 1378), Bishop of Marsico Nuovo (Italy) (1378 – 1384)
 Gerardo, O.F.M. (1353.11.06 – 1362), previously uncanonical Bishop of Caorle (1348 – 1350?)
 Alfonso (1363 – 1383)
 uncanonical, obedient to Avignon: Siffredo di Tommaso, Carmelite Order (O. Carm.) (1383 – 1388)
 uncanonical, obedient to Avignon: Francesco de Marginibus (1390 – ?)
 Simone(1390 – ?)
 Simone Margens (1401 – 1407)
 Angelo (1409? – ?)
 Sancio (? – 1433.01.14), next Bishop of Minervino (1433.01.14 – 1434)
 Lorenzo Scopulart, Dominican Order (O.P.) (1439? – ?)
 Agostino di Poggibonsi, Augustinian Order O.E.S.A. (1442? – death 1443)
 Antonio de Fontanis, O.F.M. (1443.10.30 – 1460)
 Rodrigo de Sesse, O.F.M. (1460 – death 1490)
 Pedro Stornell, O.P. (1490 – 1506? death 1510)

Suffragan Bishops of Civita (and of Ampurias)
from 1506 all incumbents of Civita are simultaneously Bishop of Ampurias (Italy) aeque principaliter 
 Francesco Manno (1506.06.05 – 1511), already (and last separate) Bishop of Ampurias (Italy) (1493.11.27 – 1511)
 Luis González, O.F.M. (1513.06.08 – death 1538)
 Giorgio Artea (1538 – 1545)
 Luis de Casas, O.E.S.A. (1545.05.22 – ?)
 Francisco Tomás (1558.05.23 – death 1572)
 Pedro Narro, Benedictine Order (O.S.B.) (1572.07.30 – 1574.10.22), next Metropolitan Archbishop of Oristano (Italy) (1574.10.22 – death 1577)
 Gaspare Vincenzo Novella (1575.09.18 – 1578.10.06), next Metropolitan Archbishop of Cagliari (Sardinia, Italy) (1578.10.06 – 1586.08.24) and Bishop of Iglesias (Italy) (1578.10.06 – death 1586.08.24)
 Miguel Rubio, Cistercian Order (O. Cist.) (1579.06.26 – 1586)
 Giovanni Sanna (1586 – death 1606)
 Diego Passamar (1613 – 1622.06.13), next Metropolitan Archbishop of Sassari (Sardinia, Italy) (1622.06.13 – death 1644)
 Giovanni de la Bronda (1622 – 1633)
 Andrea Manca (1633 – 1644.07.13), next Metropolitan Archbishop of Sassari (Sardinia, Italy) (1644.07.13 – death 1652)
 Gavino Manca Figo (1644.10.17 – death 1652)
 Gaspare Litago (1652.04.29 – 1656.07.26), previously Bishop of Bosa (Italy) (1645.04.24 – 1652.04.29); later Metropolitan Archbishop of Sassari (Sardinia, Italy) (1656.07.26 – 1657)
 Lorenzo Sampero (1656.08.28 – 1669)
 Pedro de Alagó y de Cardona (1669.08.05 – 1672.01.15), next Metropolitan Archbishop of Oristano (Italy) (1672.01.15 – 1684), Archbishop-Bishop of Mallorca (Balearic Spain) (1684 – 1701)
 José Sanchis i Ferrandis, Mercederians (O. de M.) (1672.02.22 – 1673), next Bishop of Segorbe (Spain) (1673 – 1680.02.28), Metropolitan Archbishop of Tarragona (Spain) (1680.02.28 – death 1694.03.26)
 Juan Bautista Sorribas, O. Carm. (1673.09.25 – death 1679)
 Giuseppe Acorrà (1679.09.25 – 1685.04.30), next Metropolitan Archbishop of Oristano (Italy) (1685.04.30 – 1702)
 Francesco Sampero (1685.10.01 – 1688)
 Michele Villa (1688.11.19 – 1700)
 Diego Serafino Posulo, Dominican Order (O.P.) (1702.12.11 – 1718)
 Angelo Galcerin, Conventual Franciscans (O.F.M. Conv.) (1727.05.17 – death 1735)
 Giovanni Leonardo Sanna (1736.09.26 – 1737.09.30), next Bishop of Bosa (Italy) (1737.09.30 – death 1741.10)
 Vincenzo Giovanni Vico Torrellas (1737.09.30 – 1741.07.03), next Metropolitan Archbishop of Oristano (Italy) (1741.07.03 – death 1744)
 Salvator Angelo Cadello (1741.07.05 – death 1764)
 Pietro Paolo Carta (1764 – death 1771)
 Francesco Ignazio Guiso (1772 – death 1778)
 Giovanni Antonio Arras Minutili (1779 – death 1784)
 Michele Pes (1785.02.14 – death 1804)
 Giuseppe Stanislao Paradisi (1807.09.18 – 1819.03.29), next Bishop of Ales (Italy) (1819.03.29 – death 1822) and Bishop of Terralba (Italy) (1819.03.29 – 1822)
 Stanislao Mossa (1823 – death 1827.04.09)

Suffragan Bishops of Civita–Tempio; all still also Bishop of Ampurias aeque principaliter 
 Diego Capece (1833.04.15 – death 1855.08)
 Filippo Campus (1871.11.24 – death 1887)
 Paolo Pinna (1887.05.23 – death 1892.11.17), previously Titular Bishop of Europus (1882.07.03 – 1887.05.23) as Auxiliary Bishop of Diocese of Alghero (Italy) (1882.07.03 – 1887.05.23)
 Antonio Maria Contini (1893.01.16 – 1914), previously Bishop of Ogliastra (Italy) (1882.09.26 – 1893.01.16)
 Giovanni Maria Sanna, O.F.M. Conv. (1914.12.14 – 1922.05.12), next Bishop of Gravina (Italy) (1922.05.12 – retired 1953.04.15) and Bishop of Irsina (Italy) (1922.05.12 – 1953.04.15), emeritate as Titular Bishop of Eucarpia (1953.04.15 – death 1956.10.07)
 Albino Morera (1922.12.14 – retired 1950.12.09), emeritate as Titular Bishop of Gurza (1950.12.09 – death 1952.03.20)
 Carlo Re, Consolata Missionaries (I.M.C.) (1951.12.29 – retired 1961.02.10), previously Titular Bishop of Hadrumetum (1931.12.14 – 1951.12.29) as Apostolic Vicar of Nyeri (Kenya) (1931.12.14 – 1947) and Apostolic Administrator of Apostolic Prefecture of Meru (Kenya) (1932 – 1936.09.16); later emeritate as Titular Bishop of Aspona (1961.02.10 – death 1978.08.12)
 Mario Ghiga (1961.02.10 – death 1963.03.31)
 Giovanni Melis Fois (1963.05.25 – 1970.11.07), next Bishop of Nuoro (Italy) (1970.11.07 – retired 1992.04.16); died 2009
 Carlo Urru (1971.03.07 – 1982.04.21), next Bishop of Città di Castello (Italy) (1982.04.21 – 1991.02.07); died 2002
 Pietro Meloni (1983.06.09 – see suppression 1986.09.30), next first Bishop of successor see Tempio-Ampurias (Italy) (1986.09.30 – 1992.04.16), Bishop of Nuoro (Italy) (1992.04.16 – retired 2011.04.21).

See also 
 List of Catholic dioceses in Italy
 Roman Catholic Diocese of Civita Castellana, near-samesake

References

Sources and external links 
 GCatholic - Diocese of Civitate-Tempio (&precursors)
 Bibliography - Fausania
 Francesco Lanzoni, Le diocesi d'Italia dalle origini al principio del secolo VII (an. 604), vol. II, Faenza 1927, pp. 677–679
 Raffaela Bucolo, Fausania (Olbia?), in Raffaela Bucolo (editor), Le sedi episcopali della Sardegna paleocristiana. Riflessioni topografiche, Rivista di archeologia cristiana 86 (2010), pp. 378–383
 Pier Giorgio Ignazio Spanu, La Sardegna bizantina tra 6 e 7 secolo, Oristano 1998, pp. 114–119
 Bibliography - Civita
 Enciclopedia della Sardegna, vol. 3, Sassari 2007, pp. 29–30
 Luigi Agus, San Simplicio in Olbia e la diocesi di Civita. Studio artistico e socio-religioso dell'edificio medievale, Catanzaro 2009
 Giacomo Floris, Signoria, incastellamento e riorganizzazione di un territorio nel tardo Medioevo: il caso della Gallura, Universitat de Barcelona 2013
 Anna Maria Oliva, La diocesi di Civita all'epoca dei re cattolici, in Da Olbìa ad Olbia. 2500 anni di storia di una città mediterranea, Chiarella Editrice, Sassari 1996, pp. 277–289
 Angelo Aldo Castellaccio, Olbia nel medioevo. Aspetti politico-istituzionali, in Da Olbìa ad Olbia. 2500 anni di storia di una città mediterranea, Edes - Editrice Democratica Sarda, Sassari 2004, pp. 33–70
 Konrad Eubel, Hierarchia Catholica Medii Aevi, vol. 1, pp. 188–189; vol. 2, p. 129

Former Roman Catholic dioceses in Italy
Suppressed Roman Catholic dioceses